Astele speciosa, common name the beautiful top shell, is a species of sea snail, a marine gastropod mollusk in the family Calliostomatidae.

Notes
Additional information regarding this species:
 Taxonomic remark: Some authors place this taxon in the subgenus Astele (Astele)

Description
The size of the shell varies between 20 mm and 43 mm. The pyramidal-conical shell is imperforate, flesh-colored, variegated and punctate with rufous. The whorls are plano-concave, sculptured with transverse subgranulate alternately smaller and larger lirae. The granules are reddish brown. The body whorl is obtusely angular. The base of the shell is concentrically grooved. The umbilical region is impressed and bounded by a rufous callus. The aperture is subquadrate. The solid columella is subarcuate and scarcely truncate anteriorly. The outer lip is lirate within. Its margin is subangulate in the middle.

Distribution
This marine species  occurs from Central Queensland to northern New South Wales, Australia

References

External links
 To Encyclopedia of Life
 To World Register of Marine Species
 
 Seashells of New South Wales: Astele speciosum

speciosa
Gastropods of Australia
Gastropods described in 1854